Cyril John Curnin (born 12 December 1957, Wimbledon, England) is a singer/songwriter and musician and is the lead vocalist for the new wave music group, the Fixx. As a songwriter, he has co-written over a dozen songs that have appeared on the Billboard charts. He is also known for his solo career, with five albums to date, Mayfly in 2005, The Returning Sun in 2007, Solar Minimum in 2009, The Horse's Mouth in 2013 and Lockdown in 2020.  He also released an EP of ambient music with no vocals called Cinema for the Blind in 2012.

He appeared in the Tina Turner music video "Better Be Good to Me" along with Fixx guitarist Jamie West-Oram. They both appeared on the Private Dancer album.

In addition to singing lead vocals, Curnin has occasionally played piano or guitar on various Fixx albums.

While Curnin tours regularly with The Fixx, he has also toured as a solo performer in the U.S. and in Europe. On occasion he has been joined by English singer/songwriter/guitarist Nick Harper. Recently, he was the special guest of Midge Ure for gigs in Europe.

Curnin supports the music-based cancer charity, Love Hope Strength Foundation. With them, he has participated in treks to the base camp of Mt. Everest, Kilimanjaro, Machu Picchu, and Pikes Peak to raise awareness and funds for cancer treatment facilities in remote areas of the world.

When not touring the world with The Fixx, Curnin lives in Santa Cruz, California, creating new music.

Biography

Early life
At age of 16, Curnin graduated from high school at the Wimbledon College. He then began participating in drama in college, where he studied with Fixx drummer Adam Woods.

Collaborations

Curnin provided vocals on Rupert Hine's "With One Look (The Wildest Dream)", which featured on the soundtrack to the 1985 Savage Steve Holland film, Better Off Dead.

In 1990, Curnin participated with Rupert Hine and many other artists in the world music album One World One Voice. He played piano and sang with many artists.

In October 2007, Curnin began an association with the Love Hope Strength Foundation (LHSF), a music-centric cancer charity. Cy joined with Mike Peters from The Alarm, Glenn Tilbrook from Squeeze, and Slim Jim Phantom from Stray Cats in a trek to perform at the base camp of Mount Everest in Nepal. Curnin has since participated in other LHSF treks to Machu Picchu, Pike's Peak, Mount Kilimanjaro and in December 2012, Curnin returned to Everest with the organization.

Solo discography
2005 – Mayfly
2007 – The Returning Sun
2009 – Solar Minimum
2012 – Cinema for the Blind – EP
2013 – The Horse's Mouth
2020 – Lockdown
2021 – Superseded – EP

References

External links
 Love Hope Strength Foundation

1957 births
Living people
People from Wimbledon, London
English male singers
English new wave musicians
English rock keyboardists
The Fixx members
Male new wave singers
20th-century English singers
21st-century English singers
English rock singers
20th-century British male singers
21st-century British male singers